The Son of Black Eagle (Italian: Il figlio di Aquila Nera) is a 1968 Italian historical adventure film directed by Guido Malatesta and starring Mimmo Palmara, Edwige Fenech and Franco Ressel. It was inspired by the historic success of Riccardo Freda's Black Eagle and Revenge of Black Eagle.

Cast

References

Bibliography 
  Roberto Curti. Riccardo Freda: The Life and Works of a Born Filmmaker. McFarland, 2017.

External links 
 

1968 films
Italian historical adventure films
1960s historical adventure films
1960s Italian-language films
Films directed by Guido Malatesta
Films set in the 19th century
Films set in Russia
Films set in the Russian Empire
1960s Italian films